Nether may refer to:

 The Nether, a hell-like dimension in the video game Minecraft
 The Nether, a sci-fi play
 Nether (video game),  a first-person multiplayer survival video game for Microsoft Windows

See also
Kingdom of the Netherlands, a sovereign state with territory in Western Europe and the Caribbean
Netherlands, a constituent country of the Kingdom of the Netherlands located mostly in Western Europe
Netherlands (disambiguation)
Nether region (disambiguation)
Netherworld (disambiguation)
 
 
 The Netherrealm, a hellish world in Mortal Kombat fighting game series